Hygiea may refer to:

 An alternative spelling of Hygieia, the Greek goddess of preventive healthcare/medicine
 The asteroid  10 Hygiea

See also
 Hygia, a large genus of Asian seed bugs
 Hygieia (disambiguation)
 Hygiene, a series of practices performed to preserve health